Hazel Brooks (September 8, 1924 – September 18, 2002) was an American actress.

Early years
The daughter of a sea captain, Brooks was born in Cape Town, South Africa. Her father died when she was three years old, and she moved with her mother to Brooklyn, New York. Her mother remarried and then divorced, resulting in custody battles over Brooks' half-brother. Brooks described her childhood as "very unhappy", noting that she attended 14 schools.

Career 
Brooks became a model when she was 16 and was represented by Harry Conover and Walter Thornton. A talent scout picked her and five other models to appear in the MGM film Du Barry Was a Lady (1943). She made a series of pictures at the studio during the 1940s, culminating with a supporting role in the 1947 film Body and Soul with John Garfield.

A photo of her by Durward Garyhill was voted "Most Provocative Still of 1947" by the International Society of Photographic Arts in January 1948.

She had captured almost as much attention three years earlier in 1944 when, at age 19, she married the long-time head of her studio's fabled art department, Cedric Gibbons, then 54. The wedding occurred on October 25, 1944. Although the age difference inspired a certain amount of winking in the gossip columns at the time, the marriage proved a strong one and lasted until Gibbons' death in 1960. Brooks subsequently married Dr. Rex Ross (1908-1999), a surgeon and founder of the Non-invasive Vascular Clinic at Hollywood Hospital. 

According to long-time friend Maria Cooper Janis, Gary Cooper's daughter and Cedric Gibbons's great-niece, Ross in the years after her retirement from films became a skilled still photographer. She also worked actively for a number of children's charities. 

She had subsequent roles in Arch of Triumph and Sleep, My Love in 1948, as well as The Basketball Fix (1951) and The I Don't Care Girl (1953).

Death 
Brooks died in 2002, aged 78, in the Bel Air residential district of Los Angeles.

Filmography

References

External links

Oscars Obituary Page
Hazel Brooks at aenigma

1924 births
2002 deaths
American film actresses
South African emigrants to the United States
20th-century American actresses